Mau Summit is a town in the Nakuru County of Kenya. At Google Maps, Mau Summit sits adjacent to Londiani in Kericho County.

Location
Mau Summit is located at the junction of the Kisumu-Ahero-Kericho-Mau Summit Road (B1) and the Nakuru-Eldoret Road (A104). The geographical coordinates of Mau Summit, Nakuru County, are 0°09'41.0"S, 35°41'12.0"E (Latitude:-0.161389; Latitude:35.686667).

Overview
Mau Summit is a growing town with several primary schools, a secondary school and several motels. One of the major infrastructure developments in the town is the interchange between the Kisumu-Ahero-Kericho-Mau Summit Road (B1) and the Nairobi-Malaba Road (A104).

The town is an important transit point on the Northern Corridor as several transport routes along the corridor converge here. The Nairobi–Nakuru–Mau Summit Highway terminates in this town.

See also
 Kenya Standard Gauge Railway
 List of roads in Kenya

References

External links
Two Perish In Road Accident At Mau Summit As Several Others Nurse Injuries As of 9 December 2018.

Populated places in Kenya
Cities in the Great Rift Valley
Kericho County